Milka Gehani Elpitiya Badalge Dona also known as Milka Gehani de Silva (born 24 April 2003) is a Sri Lankan artistic gymnast who represented her country at the 2018 Summer Youth Olympics and the 2019 World Championships. She earned a continental quota spot to the 2020 Summer Olympics alongside India’s Pranati Nayak after the cancellation of the 2021 Asian Championships. She is the first Sri Lankan gymnast across all disciplines to qualify to the Olympics.

Early life
Milka Gehani was born in Colombo, Sri Lanka in 2003. She won her first junior national title at the age of 8. In 2019, she received an IOC-funded scholarship to train in Japan.

Career

Milka competed at the 2016 Junior Commonwealth Championships in Namibia, qualifying to every individual final. She finished tenth in the all-around final with the score of 48.550, and placed sixth on vault, sixth on the uneven bars, fifth on the balance beam and sixth on floor exercise, also contributing to the Sri Lankan team’s fourth place finish.

In May 2017, Milka competed at the Asian Junior Championships in Bangkok, Thailand, placing eighth with the Sri Lankan team and 17th in the all-around. She improved that result at the 2018 Asian Junior Championships in Jakarta, Indonesia, finishing 14th all-around. She represented Sri Lanka at the 2018 Summer Youth Olympics in Buenos Aires, Argentina where she placed 28th all-around in qualifications but did not make the finals.

Milka turned senior in 2019, and made her World Championship debut at the 2019 World Championships in Stuttgart, Germany. She placed 114th in qualifications, missing out on Olympic qualification.

Milka began training in Japan in 2019 after receiving a scholarship from the International Olympic Committee. In September 2020, she competed at the All-Japan Championships in Takasaki, placing 40th.

In May 2021, she was awarded one of the two available Asian continental berths to the 2020 Summer Olympics due to the cancellation of the 2021 Asian Championships, as she was the highest ranked eligible athlete based on the results of the 2019 World Championships. This marked Sri Lanka’s debut in gymnastics at the Olympic Games. She also became the second Sri Lankan athlete to qualify for the 2020 Tokyo Olympics after Mathilda Karlsson. In July, it was announced that Milka would be Sri Lanka’s flag bearer at the 2020 Summer Olympics Parade of Nations alongside judoka Chamara Dharmawardana, becoming the country’s youngest ever flag bearer. At the Games, Milka placed 78th in the all-around during qualifications, and did not advance to the final. She has received an extension to her scholarship to continue her training in Japan for another two years after the Olympics.

Competitive history

References

External links
 

2003 births
Living people
Sportspeople from Colombo
Gymnasts at the 2018 Summer Youth Olympics
Sri Lankan female artistic gymnasts
Gymnasts at the 2020 Summer Olympics
Gymnasts at the 2022 Commonwealth Games